Harrison Township is one of fourteen townships in Morgan County, Indiana, United States. As of the 2010 census, its population was 1,522 and it contained 625 housing units.

Geography

Unincorporated towns
 Bluffs at 
 Waverly at 
 Waverly Woods at

Cemeteries
The township contains these three cemeteries: Independent Order of Odd Fellows, MacKenzie and Shiloh.

Major highways
  Indiana State Road 37

School districts
 Mooresville Con School Corporation

Political districts
 Indiana's 4th congressional district
 State House District 47
 State Senate District 37

References
 
 United States Census Bureau 2008 TIGER/Line Shapefiles
 IndianaMap

External links
 Indiana Township Association
 United Township Association of Indiana
 City-Data.com page for Harrison Township

Townships in Morgan County, Indiana
Townships in Indiana